Monroe Mather Stearns (September 28, 1913December 1, 1987) was an American art historian, writer, translator of French novels, editor, and collector of children's verse. Along with work as an editor at Prentice Hall, Stearns also translated French World War II and Jewish historical sources such as by Michael Bar-Zohar.

Stearns was born in Connecticut and died in New York City.

Works
Ring A Ling collection of children's verse (Artia, 1959)
Dante - Poet of Love
Julius Caesar: Master of Men 
The Story of New England (Random House, 1967)
Shays' Rebellion (Watts, 1968)
The Great Awakening (Watts, 1970)

Translations
Marcel Haedrich La Rose Et Les Soldats. The Soldier and the Rose, 1963
Sergeanne Golon Angélique Et Le Roy. Angélique and the King.  1960
Paule Cloutier Daveluy L'Été Enchanté. Summer in Ville-Marie   1963
Serge and Anne Golon Indomptable Angélique. Angélique and the Sultan.  1961
Beate Klarsfeld Partout ou ils seront. Wherever they may be! translated by Monroe Stearns and Natalie Gerardi. New York: Vanguard Press, 1975.
Michael Bar-Zohar Embassies in Crisis: Diplomats and Demagogues behind the Six-Day War. Translated from the French by Monroe Stearns.

References

1913 births
1987 deaths